Ally Graham (born 29 April 1993) is a Scottish professional footballer, who played for Dumbarton and Falkirk.

Career
Graham made his first team debut on 30 July 2011 as a substitute in Falkirk's 4–2 win over Albion Rovers in the Scottish League Cup. He went on to make his league debut as a substitute on 6 August 2011 against Raith Rovers at Starks Park. Graham scored his first goal for Falkirk against Dundee United in a Scottish League Cup fixture on 25 October 2011.

He joined Scottish Second Division side Dumbarton on 16 December 2011 on a 28-day loan.

Career statistics

External links

References

1993 births
Living people
Scottish footballers
Association football forwards
Falkirk F.C. players
Dumbarton F.C. players
Scottish Football League players